Antoni Weynerowski (12 June 1864 – 29 November 1939) was a Polish entrepreneur, founder in Bydgoszcz of the firm Leo, renamed Kobra, one of the largest in Poland in the interwar period.

Biography 
Antoni was born on 12 June 1864, in Bromberg, as Bydgoszcz was named under Prussian rule. His mother was Joanna, née Olesek.
His father, Wiktor Weynerowski, was the founder of a small felt shoe business: the pairs, produced at home, were sold by Weronika, Antoni's sister, peddling in the streets to find a buyer. With the growth of the industry, a factory was acquired, today non-existent, at the crossing of Swiętej Trojcy street and Jagiellońska street.

After graduation from gymnasium, he worked in his father's company, located on two sites: Kastanien Allee (today's Kącik street) and Albert straße (Garbary Street). He took over management of the firm in 1891, which for this occasion was rebranded "W. Weynerowski and son Shoe Factory".
In 1906, he had a new workplant built at Sedan Straße (today's Chocimska street), where about 300 people worked. When his father died in 1917, Antoni became the legal owner of the factory. 
Furthermore, he also inherited:
 a steam sawmill combined with a furniture factory at Jagiellońska street, then at 45 Promenada street;
 a villa at 165 Toruńska Street;
 a tenement at 61 Gdańska street, which also housed the furniture shop.
In 1920, Antoni Weynerowski, purchased a large property estate in Myślęcinek, a wooden district on the north of Bydgoszcz. This property was mainly used by the family as a place for hunting and recreation. Its management was given to Mr. Jaranowski, the husband of Leokadia's sister.

In the 1920s, the newly-wed couple lived in several places in Bydgoszcz: at 21 Swiętej Trojcy street, then at 14 Schiller straße (present day 12 Paderewskiego street) and at 50 Toruńska street.

At the time of the rebirth of Polish state in 1920, Antoni became a temporary counselor at the Bydgoszcz town council, as an honorary member. Acting in the background, he supported the Polish national movement by sponsoring education and the unemployed. In 1929, he handed over the factory to his sons Henryk and Witold: in their turn, they transformed in 1931, the enterprise into a share company named "LEO" Fabryka Obuwia SA", named in memoriam of their mother Leokadia and their gone brother Leon. The firm was one of the largest in Poland. In the 1920s, "LEO" had been producing daily 200 pairs of leather, felt, sports shoes and slippers.

At the end of the 1930s, the Weynerowskis bought an area of land in the vicinity of Kraków, planning to build a factory and family houses for workers there, but the outset of WWII thwarted their scheme. They also acquired tenements in Bydgoszcz, at Kościuszki street.

When German troops entered Bydgoszcz in September 1939, Antoni fled with his family to the east. During the occupation, the "LEO" factory was taken over by Nazis, while the sawmill machines and devices were dismantled and taken to Piła. On its stead, the Germans organized car workshops using the remaining buildings and halls.

The Weynerowskis reached Warsaw then Red Army-occupied Brest on the Bug river. There, on 15 October, Antoni was hospitalized for exhaustion and dementia and died on 29 November 1939. It is not known where his grave is located in Belarus today.

In 2018, Polish newsmagazine Wprost ranked Antoni Weynerowski among the 100 wealthiest Poles of the 20th century.

Philanthropy and social activities
Leokadia and Antoni were known to be generous philanthropists in the city society, under Prussian and Polish rules. Indeed in March 1920, the Weynerowski family donated 1,000 marks for books for the sick, as well as "shoes and boots" for nurses from the hospital in Bydgoszcz, where wounded soldiers fighting the Polish–Soviet War were cared after. Furthermore, they provided financial help to the local shelter for the Blind and the wounded soldiers associations.

After the conflicts, the couple gave in 1922, 10,000 marks for students from the Dąbrowski school in Szwederowo district for "purchasing books and notebooks". It had also become a tradition for them to prepare gifts for the poor during the pre-Christmas period: Leokadia and Antoni funded packages for the orphanages in which one could be certain to find shoes.

The Weynerowskis were in addition close to the parish life. In June 1920, Antoni Weynerowski donated 80,000 marks for the Church of Our Lady of Perpetual Help in the Szwederowo district.
A year later, the couple was among the people who contributed to the renovation of the Poor Clares' Church in downtown.
In May 1923, Antoni Weynerowski donated 500,000 marks for the garrison church where was attached the parish priest, Father Morakowski. The Polish literary Adam Grzymała-Siedlecki contributed has well with 50,000 marks.

Leokadia and Antoni regularly attended charity balls for the displaced students and families from Eastern Borderlands.

Besides, in June 1934, the "LEO" sports club was established at the factory, with different sections, among others: women's sports, table tennis, boxing, cycling and football.

Family

Leokadia
Leokadia Weynerowska (1877–1927), Antoni's wife was born in the Pluskołąka estate, near Wąbrzeźno. Her father, Michał Kentzer, was a Polish independence activist, working in the agriculture business. After her marriage, she moved to Bydgoszcz.

Leokadia was a social activist extremely energetic. She co-founded the Reading Room for Women in Bydgoszcz, operating from 1907 (including underground Polish language lessons in the first years), co-organized the Bydgoszcz branch of the Polish Red Cross and was a member of the female Sokół club. When she fell ill, she moved to a Berlin hospital, but rapidly died on 18 October 1927. Crowds came to her funeral at the Nowofarny cemetery in Bydgoszcz.

The couple had three sons, Leon Teodor (born 1899), Henryk (born 1901), Witold Klemens (born 1904) and one daughter Helena Apolonia (born 1917).

Leon Teodor died at the age of 19, on 1 October 1918, during the First World War at the Battle of Verdun. He was a standard-bearer, decorated with an iron cross.

Henryk
Antoni's older son, Henryk, was born on 13 July 1901, in Bydgoszcz. He received a professional education as a shoe engineer. In 1920, he fought the Soviet troops as a volunteer in the 4th Heavy Artillery Regiment of the 4th Infantry Division.
In 1929, Henryk was named head of production at the soon-to-be rebranded "LEO" factory.
He married Magdalena Cecylia née Konkolewska 1925: the family lived in the villa at 13 Mickiewicza Avenue. He had a second wife, Hanna née Gordziałkowski.

In September 1939, he was arrested and tortured by the Gestapo; he spent time in Bydgoszcz prison with Halina Stabrowska, another famous war activist.
After his release, thanks to his employees of German nationality, he moved to Konstancin near Warsaw, where he ran a thriving shoe factory providing many people, including his family members, with work and shelter. Henryk Weynerowski was a rich man and he used it to save Poles and co-financed the Home Army. At the end of the war, he went to Belgium, then to Canada and finally settled in San Francisco, United States. He died there in 1988. An obituary informing about his death appeared in the Tygodnik Powszechny on 5 June 1988. He had no offspring.

His second wife Hanna (1918–1998) survived him. She was born on 18 December 1918 in Warsaw. Together with her older sister Maria, they both ended up in the United States after the war.

In 1936, she became a painting student at the Academy of Fine Arts in Warsaw, in the studio of Tadeusz Pruszkowski; with WWII breaking out, she was however unable to complete her studies. She then joined the Home Army and was promoted to the rank of lieutenant. Her unit took part in many subversive and sabotage actions. It is during that period that Hanna took the pseudonym of Kali: she kept it to sign her paintings later on. After the suppression of the Warsaw Uprising, she was captured by the Germans and deported deep into the Third Reich territory.

After the war, she lived in Belgium for several years and returned to art studies at the Royal Academy of Fine Arts of Brussels. It is here that she met Henryk Weynerowski; they married in 1950. In the first post-war years, Hanna Weynerowska traveled a lot (Switzerland, Sweden, Luxembourg, England, France) and exhibited her works in many famous places (e.g. Brussels, London and Paris). In 1950, the couple left Europe to live in Canada, where she met success, winning many awards and honorable mentions. Hence she represented Canadian art at international exhibitions of contemporary art in Sao Paulo and Caracas. Three years later, they moved to San Francisco and settled permanently. The couple received the American citizenship in 1958.
Hanna died in San Francisco on 20 June 1998, at the age of 80.

She bequeathed a collection of 86 of her works to the Polish Museum in Rapperswil, Switzerland.

Witold
Antoni's younger son, Witold Klemens, was born on 23 November 1904, in Bydgoszcz. He graduated in Vienna and Zurich, obtaining a doctorate in economics. Returning in Bydgoszcz in 1930, he became head of finance and sales in the family business.

Witold married Julia Hermane Kessler, a Dutch girl, daughter of a rich merchant. They had four children, twins Witold Maciej and Józef, and two daughters, Helena and Julia. The family lived in a characteristic villa at 16 Kopernika Street.

After their evacuation to Brest in late 1939, Witold's family returned to Bydgoszcz, where the "LEO" factory was now producing for the benefit of the Third Reich. Thanks to his wife's citizenship, he could successfully applied for a family visa to the Netherlands.

In 1948, Witold Weynerowski family left for Canada, where they settled permanently. He visited back Bydgoszcz in 1974: he was allowed to enter the courtyard of the former "LEO" factory, but he was not invited to the factory halls. Witold Klemens died in 1987 in Canada.

One of his son, Witold Maciej (1937–2009), born on 20 November 1937, in Bydgoszcz, graduated from political science at the University of Toronto and then at Oxford. After further studies in Geneva in the 1960s, he started working in diplomacy. As a matter of fact, he was in turn the Canadian ambassador in Iraq, Tunisia and Libya. Aware of his Polish roots, Witold used to visit Poland and Bydgoszcz every year from the 1980s, usually in summer, for a month, sometimes longer. After retiring, he extended his stay to several months. He died in 2007.

Helena Apolonia
Antoni's youngest child, Helena Apolonia, was born on 24 May 1917 in Bydgoszcz. She was the wife of engineer surveyor Henryk Hącia.

The latter was the son of Kazimierz Hącia (1877–1934), who was the minister of industry and trade in the first Polish government of Ignacy Jan Paderewski, as well as  director of the National Bank of Poland branch in Poznań.

Following her brothers, Helena moved to the USA after 1945. The couple had two children. She died on 3 November 2003 in Annapolis.

Commemorations 
On 1 September 2012, an information plaque has been unveiled at the corner of Kościuszki and Chocimska streets, where stands the building of the ancient factory. It depicts the history of the factory and its importance in the city at the time.

"LEO" (renamed "KOBRA") company 

In memoriam of Antoni's wife, Leokadia, and their first son Leon, the name "Leo" was chosen for the branding of the shoe company in the late 1920s.

See also 

 Bydgoszcz
 Kali (painter)
 Polish Americans
 Polish Canadians
 List of Polish people

References

Bibliography

External links
 Exhibition of Hanna Weynerowska-Kali at the Rapperswil Polish Museum

Members of Bydgoszcz City Council
20th-century Polish businesspeople
Polish activists
People from Pomeranian Voivodeship (1919–1939)
Businesspeople from Bydgoszcz
1864 births
1939 deaths
Deaths from dementia in Belarus
World War II refugees